Carter F. Nordman (born May 27, 1998) is an American politician serving as a member of the Iowa House of Representatives from the 47th district. Elected in November 2020, he assumed office on January 11, 2021. Nordman is the youngest state legislator in Iowa and one of the youngest in the United States.

Early life and education 
A native of Adel, Iowa, Nordman graduated from Adel DeSoto Minburn High School. Nordman earned a Bachelor of Business Administration from the University of Northern Iowa.

Career 
Shortly after his high school graduation, Nordman ran for mayor of Adel against incumbent Jim Peters, losing narrowly in a closely contested election. From 2017 to 2019, Nordman served as a Legislative Assistant for members of the Iowa House of Representatives. He also previously served as Chair of the Adel Parks and Recreation Board.

Iowa House of Representatives 
Nordman was elected to the Iowa House of Representatives in November 2020 and assumed office on January 11, 2021. Nordman serves as vice chair of the House Ways and Means Committee. Nordman is also a member of the Human Rights Board.

References 

1998 births
Living people
People from Adel, Iowa
University of Northern Iowa alumni
Republican Party members of the Iowa House of Representatives